C. N. Karunakaran (1940 – 14 December 2013) was an Indian painter, illustrator and art director from Kerala. He was the Chairman of the Kerala Lalitakala Academy and a recipient of several honours including the Kerala Lalithakala Akademi Award which he won thrice. The Akademi honoured him again with the fellowship in 2005.

Biography 
C. N. Karunakaran was born in 1940 at Brahmakulam, a village near Guruvayur in Thrissur District of Kerala. He contracted typhoid while he was a child and the complications from the disease crippled him in one of his legs. Through most of his childhood, he was undergoing ayurvedic treatment because of which he could not pursue academic studies. His formal training in art was at the Government College of Fine Arts, Chennai where he learned under such as D. P. Roy Choudhury and K. C. S. Paniker to secure two diplomas; one in design and another in advanced painting.

He stayed in Chennai even after his studies, making advertisement films and working as an art director in a few Malayalam films. In 1970, he shifted his base to Kochi where he became involved with Kerala Kalapeedom (Kerala Institute of Arts). Here, he had the opportunity to interact with a host of like-minded people such as M. V. Devan, Kanayi Kunhiraman, A. C. K. Raja, Namboothiri, K. P. Soman, M. K. K. Nair, C. N. Sreekantan Nair, M. K. Sanu, Pattathuvila Karunakaran, M. Thomas Mathew and T. Ramachandran. Three years later, he founded Chitrakoodam, the first privately-owned art gallery in Kerala but the initiative ran only for four years until 1977. He was also involved with Ochre, another private art gallery in Kochi. Subsequently, he focused his career mainly on painting and illustrations; Manorama Weekly, Kalakaumudi, Kerala Kaumudi Weekly, Malayalanadu, Chintha, Deshabhimani Weekly, Kumkumam, Mathrubhumi Weekly, Bhashaposhini and India Today were some of the publications he illustrated for. He also illustrated Lore and Legends of Kerala, the English translation of Aithihyamala, published by Oxford University Press.

Karaunakaran as married to Easwari, and the couple had a son, Ayillyan and a daughter, Ammini. He died in Kochi on December 14, 2013, at the age of 73, succumbing to cardiac failure following a brief period of illness. The body was cremated at the Corporation of Cochin Ravipuram Crematorium. His son, Ayillyan Karunakaran, is an advertisement filmmaker.

Legacy 

One of the first assignments Karunakaran undertook after returning to Kerala from Chennai was the restoration of murals at Guruvayur temple. He participated in several exhibitions, both group and solo, at various places in India and abroad, including the Embassy of India in Washington, Asian Art Gallery, Virginia, Brazilian cities like Rio de Janeiro, Paraty, São Paulo and Brasilia, Asian Art Gallery, Vienna and Kuwait. During his stay in Chennai, he was also involved with the Madras Design Demonstration Centre, a unit of the Government of Tamil Nadu where he assisted the centre in improving the handicrafts business and has illustrated a number of literary works in book form.

Karaunakaran's debut in films was in 1978 when he designed the production of Ekakini, directed by G. S. Panicker. The next year, when K. R. Mohanan made his debut film, Ashwadhamavu, Karunakaran started his career as an art director, in which he also played a small part. He went on to work for four more films,
Akkare (1984) of K. N. Sasidharan, Purushartham (1986) of K. R. Mohanan, Ore Thooval Pakshikal (1988) of Chintha Ravi and Alicinte Anveshanam (1989) of T. V. Chandran.

Awards and honours 
His performance during his student years at the Government College of Fine Arts, Chennai earned him the gold medal of the Government of Madras for the best outgoing student in 1956. He received one more award before he returned to Kerala, the annual award of Madras Lalit Kala Akademi in 1964. He received the Kerala Lalithakala Akademi Award, thrice, twice in succession in 1971 and 1972 and later, in 1975. He was selected for the P. T. Bhaskara Panicker Award in 2000 and for the Malayattoor Ramakrishnan Award in 2003. The Kerala Lalithakala Akademi indicted him as a distinguished fellow in 2005; Akademi honoured him again in 2009, with Raja Ravi Varma Puraskaram, their highest award. Artist Sathypal, the former chairman of the Kerala Lalithakala Akademi, has published a book, Mythic Imagination: Art of C.N. Karunakaran, which covers Karaunakaran's work from 1950s to 2011.

Filmography

As art director 

Ashwadhamavu (1979)
Akkare (1984)
Purushartham (1986)
Ore Thooval Pakshikal (1988)
Alicinte Anveshanam (1989)

As designer 
Ekakini (1978)

As actor 
Ashwadhamavu (1979)

Solo exhibitions

The following is the list of his solo exhibitions of paintings.

Madras - 1968, 1975 & 1993
Kochi - 1970, 1984, 1992, 1994, 1996, 1997, 1998, 2000, 2001 & 2005
Calicut - 1973, 1993 & 1998
Thiruvananthapuram - 1995, 1996, 1998 & 2000
Jehangir Art Gallery, Mumbai - 1996, 2000 & 2005
Taj Art Gallery, Mumbai - 1997 & 2000
The Gallery Leela, Mumbai - 1997
ABC Art Gallery, Varanasi - 1999
Galeria Ralino, Goa - 1999
Art Konsult Gallery, New Delhi - 2000
Nehru Centre, Mumbai-2001, 2004
Kottayam- 2001
Thrissur- 2001
Rio de Janeiro, Brazil - 2002
Paraty, Brazil- 2002
São Paulo, Brazil - 2002
Brasilia, Brazil - 2002
Embassy of India Washington DC, USA - 2003
Adithi Indian Cuisine, Washington DC, USA - 2003
Asian Art Gallery, Vienna - 2003
Kuwait - 2003
Travancore Gallery, New Delhi - 2006

References

Further reading

External links

 
 
 
 
 

20th-century Indian painters
Indian illustrators
1940 births
2013 deaths
People from Thrissur district
Government College of Fine Arts, Chennai alumni
Indian art directors
Painters from Kerala
Indian advertising directors